Muksinovo (Möqsin) is a rural locality (a village) in Savaleyevsky Selsoviet, Karmaskalinsky District, Bashkortostan, Russia. The population was 204 as of 2010. There are 11 streets.

Geography 
Muksinovo is located 88 km northeast of Karmaskaly (the district's administrative centre) by road. Okhlebinino is the nearest rural locality.

References 

Rural localities in Karmaskalinsky District